Osman Nuri Örek (26 December 1925 – 24 March 1999) was a Turkish Cypriot politician, lawyer, author, and academic. He was born in Nicosia.

Upon the declaration of the Republic of Cyprus, Osman Örek became the first minister of defence of the new republic as well as being elected as the member of parliament for the Nicosia district. He served as the speaker of the parliament from July 1976 to April 1978. Örek also served as the prime minister of Turkish Federated State of Cyprus, holding this office during a short period from 21 April 1978 to 15 December 1978.

He died in London, on 24 March 1999 at the age of 73.

References

1925 births
1999 deaths
20th-century prime ministers of Northern Cyprus
Prime Ministers of Northern Cyprus
Speakers of the Assembly of Northern Cyprus
People from Nicosia
Cyprus Ministers of Defence
Istanbul University Faculty of Law alumni
Turkish Cypriot expatriates in Turkey
Turkish Cypriot expatriates in the United Kingdom
20th-century Cypriot lawyers